Spartans Youth Football Club is a football club based in Northwood, England. They are currently members of the Combined Counties League Division One and play at Northwood Park, Northwood.

History
Spartans Youth were formed in 2006 by Mark Stow. In 2017, Spartans Youth joined the Surrey Elite Intermediate League from the Middlesex County League. In 2022, the club was admitted into the Combined Counties League Division One.

Ground
The club currently play at Northwood Park, Northwood, groundsharing with Northwood.

References

Association football clubs established in 2006
2006 establishments in England
Football clubs in England
Football clubs in London
Sport in the London Borough of Hillingdon
Middlesex County Football League
Surrey Elite Intermediate Football League
Combined Counties Football League